Santa Catarina is a city in Santa Catarina Municipality in the state of Nuevo León,  Mexico that is part of the Monterrey Metropolitan area.

History

The name of this city comes from the Catholic Saint Catherine of Alexandria.
The city of Santa Catarina was not "founded" in a traditional manner; at the beginning, it was only a resting point for travelers between Monterrey and Saltillo.  The first recorded name was "Estancia de Santa Catarina" (Shelter of Santa Catarina).

During the French Invasion of Mexico in the second half of the 19th century, the  president Benito Juárez spent some days in Santa Catarina while traveling to Monterrey, and it was during this time that he elevated its status to Village. The category of Village was maintained until 1979 when the state government elevated its status to City.

Geography
Santa Catarina is located about 15 kilometers southwest of central Monterrey. As of the Mexican census of 2005, its population was 259,202 in the city and 259,896 in the municipality. The city and municipality both rank sixth in population in the state. The municipality has an area of 984.5 km² (380.12 sq mi) and includes numerous very small localities outside of the city itself.

Natural areas
Most of the National Park Cumbres of Monterrey, including the canyon of La Huasteca is located within Santa Catarina.

Also a certain portion of Cerro de las Mitras is located in Santa Catarina.

Climate

References
Link to tables of population data from Census of 2005 INEGI: Instituto Nacional de Estadística, Geografía e Informática
Nuevo León Enciclopedia de los Municipios de México

Specific

External links
 Municipio de Santa Catarina Official website
 Defensors of the huasteca website

Populated places in Nuevo León
Monterrey metropolitan area
Populated places established in 1596